Lintao County ) is administratively under the control of Dingxi, Gansu province.

History
Until the 20th century, Lintao was known as Didao.  

The Battle of Didao was fought in the area in 255  CE, during the Three Kingdoms era.

In the 8th century, an anonymous poet of the Tang Dynasty places General Geshu Han and the Chinese army in Lintao, battling the Tibetans. Poet Li Bai reference Lintao in his poem, "Ballads of Four Seasons: Winter."

Located at an important Tao River crossing, Didao City (i.e., today's Taoyang Town) was an important trade center during the Northern Song Dynasty (ca. 11-12th century), when the more northern route of the Silk Route was blocked by the Xi Xia state. It is known to have been home to hundreds of foreign merchants at the time, some of whom may have been the ancestors of today's Hui people of Gansu.

Geography
The county is located mostly on the right (eastern) bank of the Tao River, a right tributary of the Yellow River. It borders with Lanzhou in the northeast, with Linxia Hui Autonomous Prefecture in the west, and with other parts of Dingxi Prefecture-level City in the east and south.

Climate

Culture 
Lintao is known for its Huashutang candy (花酥糖) and Nuo opera.

Administrative divisions
Lintao County is divided to 5 towns and 6 townships. The county seat of Lintao County is in Taoyang town.
Towns

Townships

Transport 
China National Highway 212 and the Lanhai Expressway (G75) cross the county from the north to the south, on its way from Lanzhou to south-eastern Gansu.

A military airfield, Lintao Air Base, is located south of the county seat.

References

 
County-level divisions of Gansu
Dingxi